TASE or tase may refer to:
 Tangsa language, also Tase and Tase Naga, a Tibeto-Burman language
 Tel Aviv Stock Exchange
 To attack somebody with a Taser or electroshock weapon

See also
 Taze (disambiguation)
 Tays (disambiguation)